The 1996 Shanghai Open was a men's tennis tournament played on indoor carpet courts in Shanghai, China that was part of the World Series of the 1996 ATP Tour. It was the inaugural edition of the tournament and was held from January 29 through February 4, 1996. Sixth-seeded  Andrei Olhovskiy won the singles title.

Finals

Singles

 Andrei Olhovskiy defeated  Mark Knowles 7–6(7–5), 6–2
 It was Olhovskiy's 1st title of the year and the 13th of his career.

Doubles

 Mark Knowles /  Roger Smith defeated  Jim Grabb /  Michael Tebbutt 4–6, 6–2, 7–6
 It was Knowles' 2nd title of the year and the 6th of his career. It was Smith's only title of the year and the 3rd of his career.

References

External links
 ITF tournament edition details

Shanghai Open
Kingfisher Airlines Tennis Open
1996 in Chinese tennis